Gopal Kirati  is a Nepalese politician of Nepal. He is a member of Communist Party of Nepal (Maoist Centre).

References

External links
Ekantipur.com 
 Ekantipur.com

Living people
Communist Party of Nepal (Maoist Centre) politicians
Nepalese atheists
Year of birth missing (living people)

Members of the 1st Nepalese Constituent Assembly